PS South of Ireland was a passenger vessel built for Ford and Jackson in 1867 and then used by the Great Western Railway from 1872 to 1883.

History

She was built by William Simons of Renfrew and launched on 6 July 1867.  She was completed in 1867 and owned by Ford and Jackson and deployed on their Milford to Cork route. She was a twin-funnel sister to the PS Great Western.

In 1872 she was purchased by the Great Western Railway and transferred to the Weymouth to Cherbourg service. At 1 am on Christmas Day 1883 she was on a voyage from Cherbourg to Weymouth, and ran aground on Kimmeridge Ledges, 15 miles from Weymouth. Several steamers left Weymouth to assist in the rescue, and all hands were saved.

References

1867 ships
Ships built on the River Clyde
Passenger ships of the United Kingdom
Paddle steamers of the United Kingdom
Steamships of the United Kingdom
Ships of the Great Western Railway
Maritime incidents in December 1883
Ships sunk with no fatalities
Shipwrecks in the English Channel